Deepening may refer to:
Rapid deepening
Capital deepening
Financial deepening

Other uses:
Dredging
Port Phillip Channel Deepening Project
"The Deepening", an episode of Bob's Burgers